The Men's 800 metres at the 2011 World Youth Championships in Athletics was held at the Stadium Nord Lille Métropole on 6 & 9 July.

Medalists

Heats 
Qualification rule: first 4 of each heat (Q) plus the 4 fastest times (q) qualified.

Heat 1

Heat 2

Final

References 

2011 World Youth Championships in Athletics